Baral may refer to:

People
Baral (surname)

Places
Baral, Pakistan, a village in Punjab province, Pakistan
Baral River, a distributary river of the Ganges in India
Kishanpur baral, a village in Uttar Pradesh, India

See also
Barral, a surname
Boral (surname)